The Painted Veil is a 1925 novel by British author W. Somerset Maugham. The title is a reference to Percy Bysshe Shelley's 1824 sonnet, which begins "Lift not the painted veil which those who live / Call Life".

The novel was first published in serialised form in five issues of Cosmopolitan (November 1924 – March 1925). Beginning in May 1925, it was serialised in the United Kingdom in eight parts in Nash's Magazine.

The biographer Richard Cordell notes that the book was influenced by Maugham's study of science and his work as a houseman at St Thomas' Hospital. In the preface to his book, Maugham tells how the main characters originally were called Lane, but that the names were  changed to Fane, following the success of a libel case against the publishers by a Hong Kong couple with the name of Lane. The couple were awarded £250. To avoid similar problems after A. G. M. Fletcher, the then assistant colonial secretary in Hong Kong, also threatened legal action, the name of the colony was changed to Tching-Yen. Later editions reverted to Hong Kong but the name Fane was kept for all editions.

Synopsis
Maugham uses a third-person-limited point of view in this story, where Kitty Garstin is the focal character.

Garstin, a pretty upper-middle class debutante, squanders her early youth amusing herself by living a social high life, during which her domineering mother attempts to arrange a "brilliant match" for her. By age 25, Kitty has flirted with and declined marriage proposals from dozens of prospective husbands. Her mother, convinced that her eldest daughter has "missed her market", urges Kitty to settle for the rather “odd” Walter Fane, a bacteriologist and physician, who declares his love for Kitty. In a panic that her much younger, and less attractive sister Doris will upstage her by marrying first, Kitty consents to Walter's ardent marriage proposition with the words, "I suppose so". Shortly before Doris's much grander wedding, Kitty and Walter depart as newlyweds to his post in Hong Kong.

Just weeks after settling in the Far East, Kitty meets Charlie Townsend, the assistant colonial secretary. He is tall, handsome, urbane and extremely charming, and they begin an affair. Almost two years later, Walter, unsuspecting, and still devoted to his wife, observes Kitty and Charlie during an assignation, and the lovers, suspecting they've been discovered, reassure themselves that Walter will not intervene in the matter. Charlie promises Kitty that, come what may, he will stand by her. Aware that the cuckolded Walter is his administrative inferior, Charlie feels confident that the bacteriologist will avoid scandal to protect his career and reputation. For her part, Kitty, who never felt affection for her husband, grasps that he is fully aware of her infidelity (but he initially refrains from confronting her), and she begins to despise his apparent cowardice. She discerns, however, an ominous change in his demeanour, masked by his scrupulous, punctilious behaviour.

Walter eventually confronts Kitty about the affair and gives her a choice; either accompany him to a village on the mainland beset by an outbreak of cholera or submit to a public and socially humiliating divorce. Kitty goes to see Townsend who refuses to leave his wife. Their conversation, when she realises he doesn't wish to make a sacrifice for the relationship, unfolds gradually, as Kitty grasps Charlie's true nature. She is surprised to find when she returns home that Walter has had her clothes packed, knowing Townsend would let her down. Heartbroken and disillusioned, Kitty decides she has no option but to accompany Walter to the cholera-infested mainland of China.

At first suspicious and bitter, Kitty finds herself embarked on a journey of self-appraisal. She meets Waddington, a British deputy commissioner, who provides her with insights as to the unbecoming character of Charlie. He also introduces her to the French nuns who, at great personal risk, are nursing the sick and orphaned children of the cholera epidemic. Walter has immersed himself in the difficulties of managing the cholera crisis. His character is held in high esteem by the nuns and the local officials because of his self-sacrifice and tenderness toward the suffering populace. Kitty, however, remains unable to feel attraction toward him as a man and husband. Kitty meets with the Mother Superior, an individual of great personal force, yet loved and respected. The nun allows Kitty to assist in caring for the older children at the convent, but will not permit her to engage with the sick and dying. Kitty's regard for her deepens and grows.

Kitty discovers that she is pregnant and suspects that Charlie Townsend is the father. When Walter confronts her on the matter, she answers his inquiry by stating "I don’t know". She cannot bring herself to deceive her husband again. Kitty has undergone a profound personal transformation. Soon after, Walter falls ill in the epidemic, possibly through experimenting upon himself to find a cure for cholera, and Kitty, at his deathbed, hears his last words.

She returns to Hong Kong where she is met by Dorothy Townsend, Charlie's wife, who convinces Kitty to come to stay with them, as Kitty now mistakenly is regarded as a heroine who voluntarily and faithfully followed her husband into great danger. At the Townsend house, much against her intentions, she is seduced by Charlie and makes love with him once more despite admitting he is vain and shallow, much as she once was. She is disgusted with herself and tells him what she thinks of him.

Kitty returns to Britain, discovering en route that her mother has died. Her father, a reasonably successful barrister, is appointed chief justice of a minor British colony in the Caribbean (The Bahamas) and she persuades him to allow her to accompany him there. She decides to dedicate her life to her father and ensuring that her child is brought up avoiding the mistakes she had made.

Adaptations
The novel has been adapted for the stage and film several times:

Theatre
 The Painted Veil (19 September 1931 – 9 April 1932) at The Playhouse, London

Film
 The Painted Veil (1934)
 The Seventh Sin (1957)
 The Painted Veil (2006)

References

External links
 
 

1925 British novels
Adultery in novels
British novels adapted into films
Novels by W. Somerset Maugham
Novels first published in serial form
Novels set in China
Novels set in Hong Kong
Works originally published in Cosmopolitan (magazine)